Supercard of Honor VI was the 6th Supercard of Honor professional wrestling event produced by Ring of Honor (ROH), which took place on May 21, 2011 at Frontier Fieldhouse in Chicago Ridge, Illinois.

Storylines
Supercard of Honor VI featured professional wrestling matches, which involved different wrestlers from pre-existing scripted feuds, plots, and storylines that played out on ROH's television programs. Wrestlers portrayed villains or heroes as they followed a series of events that built tension and culminated in a wrestling match or series of matches.

Results

See also	
2011 in professional wrestling

References

External links
 Ring of Honor's official website

2011 in professional wrestling
Ring of Honor pay-per-view events
Events in Chicago
2010s in Chicago
2011 in Illinois
ROH Supercard of Honor
Professional wrestling in the Chicago metropolitan area
May 2011 events in the United States